The 2015 Boys' Youth European Volleyball Championship was played in Kocaeli and Sakarya, Turkey from April 4 – 12, 2015. The top six teams were qualified for the 2015 Youth World Championship.

Participating teams
 Host
 
 Qualified through 2015 Boys' Youth European Volleyball Championship Qualification

Pool composition

Pool standing procedure
 Match points
 Number of matches won
 Sets ratio
 Points ratio
 Result of the last match between the tied teams

Match won 3–0 or 3–1: 3 match points for the winner, 0 match points for the loser
Match won 3–2: 2 match points for the winner, 1 match point for the loser

Preliminary round
All times are Eastern European Time (UTC+03:00)

Pool I
Venue:  Şehit Polis Recep Topaloğlu Spor Salonu, Kocaeli, Turkey

|}

|}

Pool II
Venue:  Sakarya Spor Salonu, Sakarya, Turkey

|}

|}

Final round
All times are Eastern European Time (UTC+03:00)
Venue:  Sakarya Spor Salonu, Sakarya, Turkey

5th–8th place

5th–8th place playoff

|}

7th place

|}

5th place

|}

Final round

Semifinal

|}

3rd place

|}

Final

|}

Final standing

Awards

Most Valuable Player
  Bartosz Kwolek
Best Scorer
  Maximilian Auste
Best Blocker
  Aleksei Kononov
Best Receiver
  Burak Cevik
 
Best Spiker
  Abdullah Cam
Best Server
  Matej Smidl
Best Setter
  Kamil Droszyński
Best Libero
  Alessandro Piccinelli

See also
2015 Girls' Youth European Volleyball Championship

References

External links

European Boys' Youth Championship
Volleyball
Boys' Youth European Volleyball Championship
International volleyball competitions hosted by Turkey
Sport in İzmit
Sport in Adapazarı
April 2015 sports events in Turkey